Homestay: Permainan Maut (literally Homestay: Deadly Game) is a 2019 Malaysian Malay-language horror film. It follows eight college students who stays in a homestay and plays a board game that will bring death to them. It was released on 18 April 2019 in Malaysia.

Synopsis
Eight college students stays in a homestay in village for a short vacation. They are warned by the owner to stay away from the store room but they disobey and open it anyway. There, they find a game named "Spirit of the Coins" and decide to play it. In this game, they have to say the owner of this game, which is SOFEA. When SOFEA is said out load, here comes the spirit that will kill them one by one.

Cast 
 Ruminah Sidek
 Sofea Shaheera
 Asward Naslim
 Kay Shan
 Siva Garuda

References

External links 
 Homestay: Permainan Maut in Cinema.com.my
Malaysian horror films